Veta Östergård is located in the village of Veta kyrkby, a few kilometers from the village of Mantorp in Sweden.

See also
Mjölby Municipality

References

Populated places in Östergötland County
Populated places in Mjölby Municipality